Independent athletes have competed at the FINA World Aquatics Championships since 2015, either due to suspension of their governing body or as refugees.

2015 World Aquatics Championships

At the 2015 World Aquatics Championships, Sri Lanka's national federation was suspended from recognition and therefore not allowed to be represented at the championships. Consequently, athletes from Sri Lanka swam under a "FINA" banner at the championships as independent athletes. The 2015 World Championships were 24 July to 9 August 2015 in Kazan, Russia.

Four swimmers from Sri Lanka competed in nine different events, including two medley races.

Men

Women

Mixed

2017 World Aquatics Championships

At the 2017 World Aquatics Championships, FINA allowed refugees to participate under the FINA banner as independent athletes. The competition took place in Budapest, Hungary from 14 July to 30 July. The two swimmers partook in two events each.

2019 World Aquatics Championships

At the 2019 World Aquatics Championships, FINA allowed refugees to participate under the FINA banner as independent athletes. The competition took place in Gwangju, South Korea from 12 to 28 July. The two swimmers partook in two events each.

Men

Women

2022 World Aquatics Championships

At the 2022 World Aquatics Championships, FINA allowed refugees to participate under the FINA banner as independent athletes. The competition took place in Budapest, Hungary from 18 June to 3 July. The three swimmers partook in two events each.

Men

Women

See also
Suspended Member Federation at the World Aquatics Championships

References

2015 in Sri Lankan sport
FINA Independent athletes
Nations at the 2015 World Aquatics Championships
Nations at the 2017 World Aquatics Championships
Nations at the 2019 World Aquatics Championships
Nations at the 2022 World Aquatics Championships
Sri Lanka at the World Aquatics Championships